Robert Henry Walker (1884 – late 1940s) was a professional footballer who played for Luton Town, Bristol Rovers, Millwall, Northampton, New Brompton, Tottenham Hotspur, and Middlesbrough around the time of the First World War.

Walker joined Bristol Rovers from Luton town in 1912 after first playing for Middlesbrough, Spurs, New Brompton (now Gillingham), Northampton and Millwall and played 108 Southern League games, scoring forty two goals, before moving to the United States and continuing his footballing career in the Ohio League.

References 

 

1884 births
1940s deaths
People from Northallerton
Footballers from Yorkshire
English footballers
Association football midfielders
Middlesbrough F.C. players
Tottenham Hotspur F.C. players
Gillingham F.C. players
Northampton Town F.C. players
Luton Town F.C. players
Millwall F.C. players
Bristol Rovers F.C. players
English Football League players
Southern Football League players
English emigrants to the United States